What Was Before is a 2010 novel by the German writer Martin Mosebach. Through a series of vignettes, it tells the story of a man from the affluent suburbs of Frankfurt, who is asked by his girlfriend what his life was like before they met. An English translation by Kári Driscoll was published in 2014.

Reception
Publishers Weekly wrote: "Mosebach's charming, exuberant narrator is not be trusted, and the novel calls into question our notions of memory. Mosebach's writing is florid, tinged with a biting wit. ... Irreverent, playful, and intricate, Mosebach's book is a deconstruction of how we choose to tell stories."

References

External links
 What Was Before at the German publisher's website 
 What Was Before at the British publisher's website

2010 German novels
Frankfurt in fiction
German-language novels